Surgaon Banjari railway station is a small railway station in Khandwa district, Madhya Pradesh. Its Indian railway station code is SGBJ. It serves Surgaon Banjari village. The station consists of three platforms. The platforms are not well sheltered. It lacks many facilities including water and sanitation.

References

Railway stations in Khandwa district
Bhopal railway division